The Shire of Wannon was a local government area about  west of Melbourne, the state capital of Victoria, Australia.

History

Wannon was first incorporated as a shire on 15 March 1872.

On 23 September 1994, the Shire of Wannon was abolished, and along with the City of Hamilton and parts of the Shires of Mount Rouse and Dundas, was merged into the newly created Shire of Southern Grampians.

Wards

Wannon was divided into three ridings, each of which elected three councillors:
 Balmoral Riding
 Coleraine Riding
 Konongwootong Riding

Towns and localities

 Coleraine*

The shire also contained the localities of Balmoral, Carapook, Englefield, Gringegalgona, Hilgay, Konongwootong, Melville Forest, Moree, Muntham, Nareen, Parkwood, Pigeon Ponds, Tarrenlea, Tarrayoukyan, Vasey and Wootong Vale.

* Council seat.

Population

* Estimate in the 1958 Victorian Year Book.

References

External links
 Victorian Places - Wannon Shire

Wannon